Is This Legal?: The Inside Story of The First UFC from the Man Who Created It is a 2014 non-fiction book which details the backstory of the creation of the Ultimate Fighting Championship (UFC). It is co-authored by Art Davie, co-founder of the UFC, and Sean Wheelock. 

The title was inspired by a question Chuck Norris asked Davie upon hearing plans for the first UFC event. The book chronicles Davie's role in the creation of the UFC from October 1989 through the inaugural event which took place on November 13, 1993. Also included are insights into Davie's earlier life, and his military service after attending New York Military Academy, where he roomed with classmate Donald Trump for a semester.

References

External links 
 Is This Legal on Ascend Books

2014 non-fiction books
Martial arts books
Mixed martial arts mass media